Julius Friedrich Lehmann (28 November 1864, in Zurich – 24 March 1935, in Munich) was a publisher of medical literature and nationalist tracts in Munich. He was the brother of the bacteriologist Karl Bernhard Lehmann.

In Zurich he first went to the private school Beust'sche Privatschule and then to the Gymnasium.

In 1900, Lehmann left Switzerland and moved to Germany, where he bought the medical journal "Münchener Medizinische Wochenschrift" (i.e. "Munich Medical Weekly Magazine"), which he soon managed to make the most widely circulated journal of its kind in Germany. Many of the articles dealt with subjects that were to shape national-socialist ideology, like compulsory sterilization.

Lehmann became a member of the Deutsche Vaterlandspartei in 1917. He also became a member of the Thule Society. He established the Deutsche Volksverlag, which he handed over to Ernst Boepple.

Lehmann also published the journal Deutschlands Erneuerung (Germany's Renewal), which was edited by the Pan-German League. Lehmann's publishing house was an important connection between the German Nationalist Protection and Defiance Federation, the Marinebrigade Ehrhardt, then the Organisation Consul and the German National People's Party.

In 1923, Lehmann took part in the Beer Hall Putsch. He joined the Militant League for German Culture in 1928, and became a member of the NSDAP in 1931.

In 1934, at his 70th birthday, he received many honors, including the Eagle Shield of the German Reich.

Works

Hülfsbuch bei Herstellung und Preis-Berechnung von Druckwerken, (i.e. Guide for creating printing-works and determining the price), Leop. Freund, 1890, Breslau, together with Hans Paul, 2nd extended edition
Warum die Bücherpreise erhöht werden müssen! (Why book-prices should be higher!), Börsenverein d. Deutschen Buchhändler, 1925
Warum wählt das nationale Deutschland im zweiten Wahlgang Adolf Hitler? (i.e. Why does the national Germany vote for Hitler at the second ballot?), J. F. Lehmanns Verl., 1932

References 
 
Sigrid Stöckel (ed.): Die "rechte Nation" und ihr Verleger. Politik und Popularisierung im J.F. Lehmanns Verlag 1890-1979, Heidelberg: Lehmanns Verlag, 2002.

External links 
 Publisher J. F. Lehmann as Promoter of Social Psychiatry under Fascism by Peter Lehmann
 

1864 births
1934 deaths
People from Zürich
Alldeutscher Verband members
Militant League for German Culture members
Swiss publishers (people)
Swiss psychologists
Thule Society members
Nazi Party members
German book publishers (people)